Alfred Carson OBE (7 November 1859 – 24 August 1944) was an Australian journalist and social worker.

Biography 
Carson was born at Upper Swan in Western Australia to wheelwright George Carson and Charlot, née Hadley. After attending government schools he began teaching at Perth Boys' School as an assistant master when he was eighteen, becoming headmaster of the Geraldton government school in August 1878. On 5 August 1884 he married Eva Massingham of Dongara. In 1887 he joined the staff of the Victorian Express and was soon the editor.  In July 1892 he was appointed inaugural editor of the Geraldton and Murchison Telegraph. In January 1896 he worked for The West Australian, eventually becoming associate editor. In 1912 he became editor of the Western Mail and in 1917 conducted the West Australian's case in the Commonwealth Court of Conciliation and Arbitration case that determined the first journalists' award. He also travelled to the Western Front and the United Kingdom in 1918 as Western Australia's press representative.

Carson ran for parliament at the 1922 federal election, unsuccessfully contesting Perth as one of four endorsed Nationalists. He returned to journalism; he retired from 1938 until he resumed work in 1941 as a result of staff shortages caused by World War II. Carson also had an active career in social work, founding the Infant Health Association and serving as president of the Silver Chain District Nursing Association and chairman of the Bush Nursing Society (1923–44). In 1941 he was appointed Officer of the Order of the British Empire. He died in 1944.

References

1859 births
1944 deaths
Australian journalists
Officers of the Order of the British Empire
Australian newspaper editors